The TCU Horned Frogs women's soccer team represents Texas Christian University in NCAA Division I college soccer. The team is part of the Big 12 Conference and plays home matches at Garvey-Rosenthal Stadium in Fort Worth, Texas. The Horned Frogs are currently led by head coach Eric Bell, who has led the team to five consecutive NCAA Tournament appearances and a Big 12 conference title.

History
The TCU women's soccer program played their first season in 1986 under the direction of head coach David Rubinson, a TCU alum who was also the head coach of the men's team at the time.  It was during Rubinson's tenure that the women's program became the university's lone scholarship soccer team when the men's program was cut by then-athletic director Eric Hyman in 2003.

In 26 seasons under Rubinson and his successor, Dan Abdalla, the Horned Frogs enjoyed limited success.  Their eight winning seasons in that span were highlighted by a 9-8-2 campaign in 2003 that saw the Frogs finished tied for second place in Conference USA and a 14-4-2 mark in 2008 that earned a third-place finish in the Mountain West.

Eric Bell was hired as the program's third head coach in December 2011, just as the university was set to join the Big 12 Conference.  Bell came to TCU from Florida State, where he helped lead the Seminoles to three College Cup appearances during his six seasons as an assistant coach in Tallahassee.

The Frogs made their first NCAA Tournament appearance under Bell in 2016 and won their first tournament match in 2018 with a 2–1 victory over BYU in the first round of the 2018 tournament.

On November 6, 2020, TCU earned its first conference championship by defeating West Virginia, 1–0, to finish their Big 12 schedule undefeated.  Ranked third in the nation, it was at first thought that the Frogs' historic season would end without the chance to play for a national championship after the NCAA had announced in August that it was cancelling all fall sports championship events for the year due to the COVID-19 pandemic.  However, the NCAA reversed course and announced a 48-team tournament to be held in the spring of 2021.

Stadium
The Horned Frogs play their home games at Garvey-Rosenthal Stadium, located on the south end of the TCU campus and adjacent to Lupton Stadium, the home of the TCU baseball team.  It was built in 2000 on land that had previously been home to the Worth Hills Golf Course and had been acquired by the university from the Justin Boot Company.  In 2010, the Jane Justin Field House opened at the north end of the stadium with updated locker rooms and coaches offices.  The $1.5 million gift from the Justin family to fund the addition was the largest contribution ever at TCU for a project geared solely at women's athletics.

Coaches

Seasons

References

External links
 

Texas Christian University
TCU Horned Frogs soccer